The 2017 Vuelta a Andalucía was a road cycling stage race that took place in Andalusia between 15 and 19 February 2017. The race was rated as a 2.HC event as part of the 2017 UCI Europe Tour, and was the 63rd edition of the Vuelta a Andalucía.

Valverde won the opening stage of the race, and after losing the lead to 's Alberto Contador the following day, Valverde re-assumed the lead of the race by finishing second to Victor Campenaerts in the third stage time trial; Valverde was able to maintain a lead of one second over Contador for the remainder of the race. The podium was completed by Thibaut Pinot, who finished five seconds further back in third place for the  team.

With consistent finishing during the race, Valverde was also able to win the points and combination classifications, and was the best-placed Spanish rider.

Teams
21 teams were invited to take part in the race. These included nine UCI WorldTeams, ten UCI Professional Continental teams and two UCI Continental teams.

Route

Stages

Stage 1
15 February 2017 — Rincón de la Victoria to Granada,

Stage 2
16 February 2017 — Torredonjimeno to Mancha Real,

Stage 3
17 February 2017 — Lucena to Lucena, Individual time trial (ITT)

Stage 4
18 February 2017 — La Campana to Seville,

Stage 5
19 February 2017 — Setenil de las Bodegas to Coín,

Classification leadership table
In the 2017 Vuelta a Andalucía, four different jerseys were awarded. For the general classification, calculated by adding each cyclist's finishing times on each stage, the leader received a red jersey. This classification was considered the most important of the 2017 Vuelta a Andalucía, and the winner of the classification was considered the winner of the race.

Additionally, there was a points classification, which awarded a yellow jersey. In the points classification, cyclists received points for finishing in the top 15 in a stage. For winning a stage, a rider earned 25 points, with 20 for second, 16 for third, 13 for fourth, 11 for fifth with a point fewer per place down to a single point for 15th place. There was also a sprints classification for the points awarded at designated intermediate sprints, where the leadership of which was marked by a white jersey.

The fourth jersey represented the mountains classification, the leadership of which was marked by a green jersey. In the mountains classification, points were won by reaching the top of a climb before other cyclists, with more points available for the higher-categorised climbs. There was also a classification for teams, in which the times of the best three cyclists per team on each stage were added together; the leading team at the end of the race was the team with the lowest total time.

References

External links

2017 UCI Europe Tour
2017 in Spanish road cycling
2017